Stockholm Exiles Rugby Football Club is a Swedish rugby club in Stockholm. They currently play in the Allsvenskan League in the Swedish rugby union.

External links
Stockholm Exiles RFC

Swedish rugby union teams